Concordia is a neighborhood in the Northeast section of Portland, Oregon, United States, named after Concordia University, which was located within it.  The neighborhood borders are NE 22nd Ave. on the west, NE Columbia Blvd. on the north, and NE 42nd Ave. on the east.  On the south, the border is NE Prescott St. and NE Alberta Ct., to the west and east of NE 33rd Ave., respectively.  Neighborhoods bordering Concordia are Woodlawn, Vernon, and Sabin on the west, Sunderland on the north, Cully on the east, and Alameda and Beaumont-Wilshire on the south.

Most of the Alberta Street Arts District is in Concordia.

Concordia University, a private liberal arts institution associated with the Lutheran Concordia University System, had been located in the central portion of the neighborhood since 1905 but ceased operations in 2020.

Neighborhood parks include Kennedy Community Garden and Fernhill Park. Notable landmarks include the Kennedy School, a former elementary school converted into a dining and hotel facility, and the Concordia University & Community Athletic Complex which opened in 2011.

References

External links
 
 Guide to the Concordia Neighborhood (PortlandNeighborhood.com)
 Concordia Neighborhood Association (concordiapdx.org)
Concordia Street Tree Inventory Report

 
Neighborhoods in Portland, Oregon